Prof. dr. Arie Albertus (Albert) Clement (born 9 August 1962, Middelburg) is professor of musicology at the liberal arts institution University College Roosevelt, the honors college of Utrecht University in Middelburg, the Netherlands.

Albert Clement studied Musicology at Utrecht University (M.A. Degree, 1987, with highest distinction), Organ at the Brabant Conservatory, Tilburg (Teacher's and Performer's Diplomas in Organ, 1986 and 1988 respectively), and Theology at the University of Leiden. He received his doctorate from Utrecht University’s Faculty of Arts, with highest distinction (1989). In 1993 he was awarded with the Province of Zeeland's Prize for Encouragement in Arts and Sciences.

Clement has published over 200 articles and is regarded as a specialist on the works of Johann Sebastian Bach.

External links
University College Roosevelt faculty webpage

1962 births
Living people
Dutch musicologists
People from Middelburg, Zeeland
Utrecht University alumni